Mockroot is the sixth album by Tigran Hamasyan, released 17 February 2015. The album mixes traditional Armenian folk music (and other styles such as Rock and Minimalism) with jazz, in the jazz fusion style. It was the first album he released on Nonesuch Records. The album was planned to be released 26 January 2015, but was delayed and released 17 February 2015.

Content 
Mockroot features a variety of styles. The album opener "To Love," and the following track "Song for Melan and Rafik," are ballads featuring falsetto vocals over Hamasyan's piano. 

The next few tracks, "Kars 1" and "Double-Faced," feature a turn towards a heavier sound, featuring breakdown sections some critics compared to those of Meshuggah. These are followed by the ballad “The Roads That Bring Me Closer to You" and the laid-back solo piano composition "Lilac." A similar balance between piano ballads and heavy djent-like tracks is followed for much of the tracklist, only interrupted by  "Kars 2 (Wounds of the Centuries)," which takes a more minimalist approach.

The final three named tracks, "To Negate," "The Grid," and "Out of the Grid," are among the heaviest on the album, described as "dissonant, post-modern, Armenian-infused post-bop, followed by angular djent-like jazz." "To Negate" has been described by Hamasyan as being "linked" to the opening track "To Love," both songs having been inspired by Armenian poet Petros Durian. The two songs are in the same key, though "To Negate" is in "an odd, Armenian mode." The album closes with a hidden track in waltz time, which had been written in 2009 and played live for years prior to its inclusion on Mockroot.

Hamasyan has stated that "Armenia looms large throughout Mockroot." In addition to the general musical style, this is reflected by the fact that several track titles reference locations in current or historical Armenia.
"Kars 1" and related track "Kars 2 (Wounds of the Centuries)" are named for Kars, a region in modern-day Turkey that Hamasyan cites as the ancestral home of his maternal grandparents. Similarly, "The Apple Orchard in Saghmosavanq" refers to Saghmosavanq, a monastery near Yerevan.

Track listing

References 

2015 albums
Tigran Hamasyan albums
Jazz fusion albums
Nonesuch Records albums